Joseph Mazzarino (born June 4, 1968) is an American actor, puppeteer, writer and director. He is best known for his roles on Sesame Street as Murray Monster, Stinky the Stinkweed and other Muppets, and being Head Writer and Director on Sesame Street, winning 22 Emmy Awards for his work.

Career
Former Muppet performer Camille Bonora influenced Mazzarino when she taught an improvisation class at his university, and eventually introduced him to Jim Henson. Mazzarino later became the head writer for Sesame Street and also worked on The Adventures of Elmo in Grouchland, Muppets from Space, and Kermit's Swamp Years.

When Mazzarino auditioned for Sesame Street, he wrote a sketch called "Colambo" and soon found himself cast in the title role. Since then, he had been a prominent member of the Sesame Street cast where he performed Horatio the Elephant, Ingrid, Murray Monster, Papa Bear, Stinky the Stinkweed, and various characters until 2015, when he resigned.

Mazzarino spent the past few years as a writer/producer on the Showtime original series Kidding starring Jim Carrey.  He directed all 13 episodes of the Julie Andrews' Netflix series Julie's Greenroom, where he also served as a writer. Mazzarino spent over 20 years on Sesame Street in multiple roles: Head Writer, Director, Lyricist and Muppet performer.  He received 25 Emmy Awards for his work in multiple categories (Outstanding Original Song, Outstanding Writing, Outstanding Direction and Outstanding Performer in a Children's Series).

Mazzarino is currently writing on a new PBS series from the Fred Rogers Company entitled Donkey Hodie and is about to begin his third season as a writer for the PBS animated series Nature Cat.

Personal life
Mazzarino is married to actress Kerry Butler. They have two adopted daughters, one named Segi for whom he wrote the Sesame Street song "I Love My Hair". The Muppet who sang the song was also named Segi.

Filmography

Television
 30 Rock - puppeteer ("Apollo, Apollo")
 Aliens in the Family – Spit (voice)
 Big Bag – Chelli, Lyle the Sock
 Blue's Clues – Boogie Woogie, Roary ("Blue's Room" segments)
 Blue's Room – Boogie Woogie, Roary, Sprinkles (season 2)
 CityKids – Captain (Inside the Head)
 Cyberchase – Matt (Pilot)
 Dog City – Artie Springer
 Donkey Hodie – Game Show Gator
 Elmo's World – Big Foot, Brown Bunny (in "Elmo Has Two! Hands, Ears & Feet"), The Cheese, Papa Bear, Ingrid, Stinky the Stinkweed, Old McDonald, The Two Headed Monster (left-head)
 Eureeka's Castle – Fluffy
 Jack's Big Music Show – Spunky the Alien and Henry the Monster
 Journey to Ernie – The Mighty Joke Tree, Sammy (squirrel), Artist Walrus, Penguin (voice), Kittens 2 and 3
 Mo Willems: Don't Let the Pigeon Do Storytime! — The Pigeon
 Muppet Time – Icky No-No, Kirby, one of the Frog Scouts
 Nick Jr. – Flexy ("Little Big Room" segments), Tube, Smelly ("Play Along" segments)
 Nature Cat – Cruiser
 Panwapa – Bill the Bug
 The Planet Matzah Ball – Oogie 
 Sesame Street – Murray Monster, Blögg ("Abby's Flying Fairy School" segments), Colambo, Horatio the Elephant, Ingrid, Joey Monkey, Merry Monster, Narf, Old MacDonald, Papa Bear, Stinky the Stinkweed, Two-Headed Monster (left head, 2001–2016), The Fairy Godperson, Zostic ("Super Morphin Mega Monsters" segments), Redhead Caveman (Primitive segments)
 Sheep in the Big City – General Lee Outrageous, Buddy Somebody, Count D'Ten
 The Wubbulous World of Dr. Seuss – Elwood the Jester (in "The King's Beard"), Lester McBird (in "Lester Leaps In")
 Team Umizoomi - Brachiosaurus (voice) (Uncredited)
 Unbreakable Kimmy Schmidt - Pupazza
 Gabby's Dollhouse - Catrat, DJ Catnip, Cakey Cat (season 2)

Film
 A Sesame Street Christmas Carol – Joe Marley, Joey Dickens
 CinderElmo – King Fred, Blue Mouse
 123 Count with Me – Ingrid
 Elmo Says BOO! – Joey Monkey, Sir Count-A-Lot
 Elmo's Christmas Countdown – Papa Bear, Stan the Snowball
 The Wild Wild West - Narf (Monster Clubhouse segment only)
 Elmopalooza – Horatio the Elephant
 Ghost Town – Food Delivery Guy
 Big Bird's Birthday or Let Me Eat Cake – Additional Muppet Performer
 Kermit's Swamp Years – Goggles the Toad, Turtle No. 1
 Muppet Meeting Films – Gimley's Boss, Wesley, Franklin (2nd Time), Coffee Guy, Smerdley (2nd Time)
 Billy Bunny's Animal Songs – Frog, Gopher
 Sesame Street's 25th Birthday: A Musical Celebration! – Joey Monkey, Merry Monster
 Sesame Street Celebrates Around the World – MNN Logo Purple Monster
 Sesame Street Jam: A Musical Celebration – Joey Monkey, Merry Monster
 The Adventures of Elmo in Grouchland – Bug
 The Muppets Celebrate Jim Henson – Additional Muppets
 Demon Days Live - 2-D (Puppetry only, uncredited)

Crew work
 Bear in the Big Blue House – Writer ("The Yard Sale" episode)
 Cyberchase - Writer ("Invasion of the Funky Flower" episode)
 Elmo's Christmas Countdown – Writer
 Elmopalooza – Writer
 Julie's Greenroom – Director/Writer/Co-Producer
 Kermit's Swamp Years – Screenplay Co-Writer
 Muppets from Space – Screenplay Co-Writer
 Sesame Street – Writer/Director
 Sheep in the Big City – Writer
 The Adventures of Elmo in Grouchland – Screenplay Co-Writer
 The Upside Down Show – Writer
 Kidding – Writer

Awards and nominations

Writers Guild of America Award
2009 WGA Award for Elmo's Christmas Countdown
 Daytime Emmy Award Nominations
 2000 Daytime Emmy Award Nominee for Outstanding Writing in a Children's Series (Sesame Street)
 2007 Daytime Emmy Award Nominee for Outstanding Writing in a Children's Series (Sesame Street)
 2008 Daytime Emmy Award Nominee for Outstanding Directing in a Children's Series (Sesame Street)
 Directors Guild of America Nominations
 2014 DGA Award Nominee for Directing for Children's Programs (Sesame Street, "4504 Numericon")
 2015 DGA Award Nominee for Directing for Children's Programs (Sesame Street, "The Cookie Thief")

References

External links
 

Living people
Puppeteers
American puppeteers
American male voice actors
American male film actors
American male television actors
American male video game actors
American male writers
American Lutherans
Lutherans from New York (state)
1968 births
Sesame Street Muppeteers
Muppet performers